Sayyid Zain Hamid Cheruseethi Thangal (Arabic : سيّد زين حامد بن اب الخير عبد الله, Malayalam:  സയ്യിദ് സൈൻ ഹാമിദ് ചെറുസീതി തങ്ങൾ⁠⁠⁠⁠) was a Sufi leader born in the city of Tarim of Hadhramaut which was a part of Yemen in the year 1669 (C.E) (A.H. 1080).

Family and early life 
Cherussethi Thangal learned Quran and Tajwid in his hometown, then he gained further religious knowledge from scholars including Abdullah ibn Alawi al-Haddad [1634 - 1720]. He went to study in Mecca for a short time, before travelling to India.

In Malabar 
Cheruseethi Thangal alighted at Kerala with his brother Sheikh Sayyid Jamaludeen Muhammudul Wahthi in Hijri year 1113 (1701 C.E). They came to Thiruvananthapuram and stayed there for a short while. After that, they stayed in Tanur. Finally, they came to Vadakara and settled there.

As a result of tolerance to Muslims and the esteem in which Muslim leaders and scholars were held by Zamorin rulers, Sayyids came to Malabar and started to settle there. Natives and rulers alike held them in high esteem and accepted them.

Since locals could not pronounce the Arabic names of all visitors who came and settled in Vadakara, they called them Valiya Seethi Thangal and Cheriya Seethi Thangal. The landlords of Valiyakath ancestral home gave a double-storied house, under their ownership in Thazhengadi, to Thangal brothers to live for free.

In the spiritual world 
Cheruseethi Thangal was initiated to Qadariya Tariqath by Sayyid Abdurahman Al Hydrose who came to Malabar from Hadhramaut in 1703 and whose final resting place is Valiyajarathingal at Ponnani.

In 1766, Tipu Sultan and his father Hyder Ali came to Kozhikode via Kadathanad. They came to Cheruseethi Thangal and sought his blessings. In 1770 Qutub Zaman Mouladaveela Mamburum Sayyid Alavi Thangal (1752–1845) came to Malabar and became the disciple of Cheruseethi Thangal.

Demise 

He died on A.H 1185 Jamad-ul-Awwal 17 (29 August 1771 C.E, Thursday).

References 

1669 births
1771 deaths
People from Kozhikode district